Pari or PARI may refer to:

Places 
 Pari, Estonia, a village in Vastseliina Parish, Võru County, Estonia
 Pari, Hamadan or Piruz, a village in Hamadan Province, Iran
 Pari, Iran, a village in Zanjan Province, Iran
 Pari, Civitella Paganico, a village in Grosseto, Tuscany, Italy
 Pari, Gilgit Baltistan, a village in Skardu district, Pakistan
 Pari, Raebareli, a village in Uttar Pradesh, India
 Piruz, Iran, also known as Pari

Film
 Pari (1995 film), an Iranian production
 Pari (2018 Pakistani film)
 Pari (2018 Indian film), a Hindi film

People
 Akilan Pari (born 1989), Indian basketball player
 Claudio Pari (1574-1619), Italian composer
 Pari Saberi (born 1932), Iranian drama and theatre director
 Vēl Pāri, an ancient Tamil king
 Pari people, an ethnic group in Sudan

Acronym
 People's Archive of Rural India, a digital journalism platform in India
 Philippine Association of the Record Industry
 Pisgah Astronomical Research Institute, an astronomical observatory near Asheville, North Carolina, United States

Other uses
 Pari (unit), an obsolete unit of measure
 Pari Temple, a 14th-century Hindu temple in East Java, Indonesia
 PARI/GP, a computer algebra system
 Pari, a cultivar of Karuka
 Peri, also spelled pari, a supernatural being in Iranian folklore

See also
 Päri (disambiguation)
 Paris (disambiguation)
 Peary (disambiguation)
 Peri (disambiguation)
 Perrie (disambiguation)
 Perry (disambiguation)